This is a comprehensive discography of Welsh DJ and record producer Sasha. His discography comprises three studio albums, three compilation albums, two live albums, thirteen mix albums, four extended plays and twenty two singles. He has also released five mix albums and one video album with John Digweed as Sasha & John Digweed.

Albums

Studio albums

Compilation albums

Live albums

Mix albums

Extended plays

Singles

References

Discographies of British artists
Electronic music discographies